Chemokine (C-X-C motif) ligand 9 (CXCL9) is a small cytokine belonging to the CXC chemokine family that is also known as monokine induced by gamma interferon (MIG). The CXCL9 is one of the chemokine which plays role to induce chemotaxis, promote differentiation and multiplication of leukocytes, and cause tissue extravasation.

The CXCL9/CXCR3 receptor regulates immune cell migration, differentiation, and activation. Immune reactivity occurs through recruitment of immune cells, such as cytotoxic lymphocytes (CTLs), natural killer (NK) cells, NKT cells, and macrophages. Th1 polarization also activates the immune cells in response to IFN-γ. Tumor-infiltrating lymphocytes are a key for clinical outcomes and prediction of the response to checkpoint inhibitors. In vivo studies suggest the axis plays a tumorigenic role by increasing tumor proliferation and metastasis.  CXCL9 predominantly mediates lymphocytic infiltration to the focal sites and suppresses tumor growth.

It is closely related to two other CXC chemokines called CXCL10 and CXCL11, whose genes are located near the gene for CXCL9 on human chromosome 4. CXCL9, CXCL10 and CXCL11 all elicit their chemotactic functions by interacting with the chemokine receptor CXCR3.

Biomarkers 

CXCL9, -10, -11 have proven to be valid biomarkers for the development of heart failure and left ventricular dysfunction, suggesting an underlining pathophysiological relation between levels of these chemokines and the development of adverse cardiac remodeling.

This chemokine has also been associated as a biomarker for diagnosing Q fever infections.

Interactions 

CXCL9 has been shown to interact with CXCR3.

CXCL9 in immune reactions 
For immune cell differentiation, some reports show that CXCL9 lead to Th1 polarization through CXCR3.     In vivo model by Zohar et al. showed that CXCL9, drove increased transcription of T-bet and RORγ, leading to the polarization of Foxp3− type 1 regulatory (Tr1) cells or T helper 17 (Th17) from naive T cells via STAT1, STAT4, and STAT5 phosphorylation.

Several studies have shown that tumor associated macrophages (TAMs) play modulatory activities in the TME, and the CXCL9/CXCR3 axis impacts TAMs polarization. The TAMs have opposite effects; M1 for anti-tumor activities, and M2 for pro-tumor activities. Oghumu et al clarified that CXCR3 deficient mice displayed increased IL-4 production and M2 polarization in a murine breast cancer model, and decreased innate and immune cell-mediated anti-tumor responses.

For immune cell activation, CXCL9 stimulate immune cells through Th1 polarization and activation. Th1 cells produce IFN-γ, TNF-α, IL-2 and enhance anti-tumor immunity by stimulating CTLs, NK cells and macrophages. The IFN-γ-dependent immune activation loop also promotes CXCL9 release.

Immune cells, like Th1, CTLs, NK cells, and NKT cells, show anti-tumor effect against cancer cells through paracrine CXCL9/CXCR3 in tumor models. The autocrine CXCL9/CXCR3 signaling in cancer cells increases cancer cell proliferation, angiogenesis, and metastasis.

CXCL9/CXCR3 and the PDL-1/PD-1 
The relationship between CXCL9/CXCR3 and the PDL-1/PD-1 is an important area of research. Programmed cell death-1 (PD-1) is heavily expressed on T cells at the tumor site than on T cells present in the peripheral blood and anti-PD-1 therapy can inhibit “immune escape” and the immune activation. Peng et al. showed that anti-PD-1 could not only enhance T cell-mediated tumor regression but also increase the expression of IFN-γ but not CXCL9 by bone marrow–derived cells. Blockade of the PDL-1/PD-1 axis in T cells may trigger a positive feedback loop at the tumor site through the CXCL9/CXCR3 axis. Also using anti-CTLA4 antibody, this axis was significantly up-regulated in pretreatment melanoma lesions in patients with good clinical response after ipilimumab administration.

CXCL9 and melanoma 
CXCL9 has also been identified as candidate biomarker of adoptive T cell transfer therapy in metastatic melanoma. The role of CXCL9/CXCR3 in TME and immune response - this plays a critical role in immune activation through paracrine signaling, impacting efficacy of cancer treatments.

References

Further reading

External links 
 

Cytokines